Benjamin Kaufman known as Benny Kaufman (c. 1910 – date of death unknown; possibly 1954) was a speedway rider from the United States.

Speedway career 
Kaufman was a leading speedway rider in the late 1930s. He reached the final of the Speedway World Championship in the 1938 Individual Speedway World Championship.

He was the North American champion in 1937. and he rode in the top tier of British Speedway, riding for Wimbledon Dons.

World Final Appearances
 1938 -  London, Wembley Stadium - 9th - 12pts

References 

1910s births
Year of death unknown
Year of birth uncertain
Year of death uncertain
American speedway riders
Wimbledon Dons riders
Southampton Saints riders